Tyler Marenyi (born October 11, 1990), better known by his stage name Nghtmre (stylized as in all caps; pronounced "nightmare"), is an American DJ and electronic dance music producer based in Los Angeles, California.

Early life 
Marenyi was born in Stamford, Connecticut, but was raised in Raleigh, North Carolina. He attended North Raleigh Christian Academy, where he was a member of the tennis team. He went to Elon University and obtained a degree in finance prior to moving to Los Angeles to pursue a musical career. He then attended Icon Collective Music Production School where he met fellow producers Derek and Scott of Slander and developed a working relationship, subsequently resulted in numerous collaborations and frequently touring together as headlining acts.

Career

2014–2015 
In the beginning, he created trap and house remixes of songs by Tiësto, Rae Sremmurd, and Skrillex. Later on, he started producing his own songs, as well as, collaborating with other producers. He gained recognition when Skrillex played one of his songs during a set at Ultra Music Festival. Marenyi eventually signed to Diplo's record label, Mad Decent and had his first song, "Street", released shortly after. He debuted at EDC Las Vegas 2015, which was his first festival performance. He has regularly toured and collaborated with fellow DJs and producers, Slander, with whom he released his debut EP, Nuclear Bonds, also later released on Mad Decent.

2016–present 
In 2016, he released his EP titled Nghtmre which had charted on Billboard's Top Dance/Electronic Albums chart. He collaborated with Pegboard Nerds and Krewella to release "Superstar" as a single on the Vancouver-based label, Monstercat. He later collaborated with producer Dillon Francis to release the single "Need You" on Mad Decent. An official music video for the song was released by Francis on May 9, 2016, via YouTube. He later collaborated with Flux Pavilion to release "Feel Your Love" as a single on his label, Circus Records. He collaborated with rapper Afro to release the single "Stronger" which would also be released on Mad Decent. He additionally collaborated with Toronto-based production duo Zeds Dead to release "Frontlines" as a single which would later be released on their debut album Northern Lights through their label, Deadbeats. He collaborated with LOUDPVCK to release "Click Clack" as a single through Skrillex's Owsla label. In 2017, Marenyi was in the lineup at Coachella Valley Music and Arts Festival.

Discography

Albums

Extended plays

Singles

Remixes
2018: Ekali and Zhu — "Blame" (Nghtmre Remix)
2019: Dillon Francis and Alison Wonderland — "Lost My Mind" (Nghtmre Remix)
2019: Seven Lions, Slander and Dabin featuring Dylan Matthew — "First Time" (Nghtmre Remix)
2019: Habstrakt — "The One" (Nghtmre Remix)
2019: Nghtmre and ASAP Ferg — "Redlight" (Nghtmre VIP)
2019: Nghtmre and Gunna — "Cash Cow" (Nghtmre and Blvk Jvck VIP)
2020: Cheat Codes featuring Trippie Redd, Blackbear, Prince$$ Rosie — "No Service in the Hills" (Nghtmre Remix)
2020: Falling in Reverse — "Popular Monster" (Galantis and Nghtmre Remix)
2020: Zhu — "I Admit It" (Nghtmre Remix)
2021: Illenium and Matt Maeson — "Heavenly Side" (Nghtmre Remix)

References 

American DJs
American electronic musicians
Dubstep musicians
Living people
Elon University alumni
Musicians from Stamford, Connecticut
Musicians from Raleigh, North Carolina
21st-century American musicians
Monstercat artists
Electronic dance music DJs
1990 births